Steve Heckard (born April 12, 1943) is a former American football wide receiver. He played for the Los Angeles Rams from 1965 to 1966.

References

1943 births
Living people
American football wide receivers
USC Trojans football players
Davidson Wildcats football players
Los Angeles Rams players